Custodi di quella fede was a papal encyclical promulgated by Leo XIII in 1892 addressed to the Italian people.

It accompanied the encyclical Inimica vis that was addressed to the Italian bishops. It asked Catholics to work against Freemasonry by guarding families against infiltration, and establishing Catholic institutions such as schools, mutual aid societies and newspapers. It generally urged Catholics to shun secular and non-religious societies.

See also  
 Anticlericalism and Freemasonry
 Anti-Masonry
 Catholicism and Freemasonry
 Christianity and Freemasonry
 Clarification concerning status of Catholics becoming Freemasons
 List of encyclicals of Pope Leo XIII
 Papal Documents relating to Freemasonry

References

Catholicism and Freemasonry
Encyclicals of Pope Leo XIII
1892 documents
1892 in Christianity
December 1892 events